This is a list of active and extinct volcanoes.

References

Tristan da Cunha
Volcanoes of Tristan da Cunha